Adrian "Ace" Carrio (born January 12, 1989) is an American race car driver from Monument, Colorado.

Carrio was born in Glendora, California. He began go-karting at the age of 8, winning several national championships.  Carrio stepped up to cars in 2004, finishing second in the Formula TR 2000 Championship.  In 2005, he moved up to the competitive Star Mazda series and won the series title in 2006 with 2 wins and 6 pole positions.  For 2007, Carrio moved to the Champ Car Atlantic series, driving for Genoa Racing. The season was a struggle, with Carrio finishing 18th in points with only two top-ten finishes, a 6th at San Jose and a 7th at Edmonton. Carrio has not participated in a professional race since.

External links

Racing drivers from California
Racing drivers from Colorado
1989 births
Living people
People from Glendora, California
Sportspeople from Los Angeles County, California
Atlantic Championship drivers
North American Formula Renault drivers
Indy Pro 2000 Championship drivers
People from Monument, Colorado